was a town located in Takashima District, Shiga Prefecture, Japan. It was the center of the district.

As of 2003, the town had an estimated population of 14,018 and a density of 114.21 persons per km2. The total area is 122.74 km2.

On January 1, 2005, Imazu, along with the towns of Takashima, Adogawa, Makino and Shin'asahi, and the village of Kutsuki (all from Takashima District), was merged to create the city of Takashima.

Climate

References

Dissolved municipalities of Shiga Prefecture
Takashima, Shiga